Matthew Haggarty (born 8 January 1991) is an English professional rugby league footballer who most recently played for the North Wales Crusaders in the Kingstone Press League 1, as a .

He is on a season long loan from St. Helens.

References

External links
Red Devils profile

1991 births
Living people
Barrow Raiders players
Dewsbury Rams players
English rugby league players
North Wales Crusaders players
Oldham R.L.F.C. players
Rochdale Hornets players
Rugby league props
Salford Red Devils players
St Helens R.F.C. players
Whitehaven R.L.F.C. players